The Advisory Committee on the Future of the United States Space Program, commonly known as the Augustine Committee, was a 1990 space policy group requested by Vice President Dan Quayle, chairman of the National Space Council. The objective of the committee was to evaluate the long-term future of NASA and the United States civilian space program. The committee's final report (known as the Augustine Report) recommended that the space program should comprise five activities—space science, Earth science, human spaceflight, space technology and space transportation—with space science as the highest priority for funding. It also proposed an unmanned launch vehicle to replace some Space Shuttle launches, and a scaled-back redesign of space station Freedom.

Original recommendations 
In its original report, the committee ranked five space activities in order of priority:
 Space science
 Technology development
 Earth science
 Unmanned launch vehicle
 Human spaceflight
At a dinner with Vice President Quayle and committee members, Office of Management and Budget director Richard Darman argued that the low priority projects would be eliminated during the budget process. The committee members decided to change their report. Space science was still given first priority, but the other activities were assigned equal priority behind space science.

After discussing the Space Shuttle Challenger disaster the executive summary of the committee's report recommended, "saving the Space Shuttle for those missions requiring human presence."

Members 
The committee had twelve members in total, with one chairman and one vice chairman.
 Norman Augustine (chairman), CEO of Martin Marietta
Laurel L. Wilkening (vice chairman), provost of the University of Washington
 Edward Aldridge, president of the McDonnell Douglas Electronic Systems Company
 Joseph Allen, former astronaut and president of Space Industries International
 D. James Baker, president of Joint Oceanographic Institutions
 Edward Boland, former Massachusetts congressman
 Daniel Fink, former senior vice president of General Electric
 Don Fuqua, president of the Aerospace Industries Association of America
 Robert Herres, former commander of the United States Space Command
 David Kerns, chairman of Xerox
 Louis Lanzerotti, chairman of the Space Studies Board
 Thomas Paine, former NASA administrator

See also 
 Criticism of the Space Shuttle program
 Review of United States Human Space Flight Plans Committee
 Space Exploration Initiative

References

External links 
 Report of the Advisory Committee on the Future of the U.S. Space Program NASA History Division
 Principal Recommendations of the Augustine Commission, 1990 NASA Public Affairs Office

NASA oversight
Reports of the United States government
Space policy of the United States
United States national commissions
Augustine studies